Platforms Piece consists of three bronze sculptures of commuters at Brixton railway station, completed by the British artist Kevin Atherton in 1986.

History

In 1985 the Public Art Development Trust suggested to British Rail that they commission a  piece of art for Brixton railway station. The sculptures were part of the £1m Brixton Station Improvement Scheme, which was devised by the London Borough of Lambeth, British Rail, and the Department of the Environment.

Atherton, the artist, wanted his three figures to represent the real inhabitants of Brixton, and made sure to choose three models who had personal connections to Brixton: Peter Lloyd, Joy Battick and Karin Heistermann.

Atherton made the bronze statues using the lost-wax casting process, having made plaster moulds of his three models in a disused ticket office on the station platform (converted into a studio for his use).

The sculptures were unveiled by Sir Hugh Casson, who had also been on the selection panel that chose Atherton's pitch for the job, on 30 June 1986, once the station had been renovated. Platforms Piece won the Association of Business Sponsorship of the Arts Industry Year award for the best commission in any medium in 1986.

In November 2016, Platforms Piece was given listed status by Historic England, which claimed that two of the figures were the first public sculptural representations of black British people in the UK. However, this claim is disputed due to the sculpted representation of George Ryan in a relief panel on the plinth of Nelson's Column in London, dating from the 1860s.

In 2016 the statues forming 'Platforms Piece' were temporarily removed for refurbishment and returned to the station in January 2023. At the same time, Joy Battick, one of the original models, was invited to model for a new statue, Joy II, to accompany the original statues. The two statues of Joy Battick face one another across the railway at the South end of the platforms. The statues of Karin Heistermann and Peter Lloyd face one another at the North end of the platforms.

References

External links
 
 
 
 

1986 sculptures
Brixton
Buildings and structures in the London Borough of Lambeth
Grade II listed buildings in the London Borough of Lambeth
Outdoor sculptures in London
Public art in London
Tourist attractions in the London Borough of Lambeth
1986 establishments in England